Agostino Priuli (1596–1632) was a Roman Catholic prelate who served as Bishop of Bergamo (1627–1632).

Biography
Agostino Priuli was born in Venice, Italy on 5 Oct 1596.
On 8 Feb 1627, he was appointed during the papacy of Pope Urban VIII as Bishop of Bergamo.
He served as Bishop of Bergamo until his death on 4 Oct 1632.

References

External links and additional sources
 (for Chronology of Bishops) 
 (for Chronology of Bishops) 

17th-century Roman Catholic bishops in the Republic of Venice
Bishops appointed by Pope Urban VIII
1596 births
1632 deaths